Men of Two Worlds is a 1946 British Technicolor drama film directed by Thorold Dickinson and starring Robert Adams, Eric Portman and Phyllis Calvert. The screenplay concerns an African music student who returns home to battle a witch doctor for control over his tribe.

The film was released in the United States as Kisenga, Man of Africa.

Plot
Kisenga is a composer and pianist from Marashi in Tanganyika who has spent fifteen years in London. He decides to return to his homeland to help the District Commissioner, Randall, in the work of health care.

Randall explains that an outbreak of sleeping sickness caused by the tsetse fly is moving across Tanganyika and has almost reached Marashi. He wants to  transfer the population of 25,000 to a new settlement on higher ground and set fire to the bush to destroy the tsetse fly. Randall is helped by Dr Munro.

Kisenga arrives at Marashi. His sister Saburi is engaged to a young man named Ali, an assistant at the dispensary. Kisenga meets the Chief Rafuf, who is under the control of Margoli, a witch doctor. Rafuf does not want to move.

Kisenga decides to settle in his old home and teaches music. The tsetse fly gets closer to the village and Doctor Burton wants to do blood tests on villagers, which are opposed by Margoli.

Margoli fights the doctors and Kinsenga's father dies of malaria. Margoli casts spells against Kisenga. He falls ill but recovers when the children perform Kisenga's music. The clearing of the village begins and the people leave for their new settlement.

Cast
 Phyllis Calvert – Doctor Caroline Munro
 Eric Portman – District Commissioner Randall
 Robert Adams – Kisenga
 Orlando Martins – Margoli
 Arnold Marlé – Professor Gollner
 Cathleen Nesbitt – Mrs Upjohn

Production

Development
The film was written by Joyce Carey who had worked in Africa as a civil servant. She and Dickinson drafted a treatment then in January 1943 they travelled from England to Tanganika, doing a first draft of the script. As soon as they arrived Dickinson fell ill with malaria.

Thorold Dickinson said "Our picture categorically insists that witchcraft does exist; that it is suggestion, supported by all the trappings of religion, and can only be defeated by counter-suggestion.It's a struggle of mind against mind.  There is a terrific blood motive running through the story. Blood drips in color. The East Africans believe that blood is the life. Blood gives power. This primitive thing – this bloodlust – is really pure fascism and has got to be killed."

Esther Makumbi was the one lead actor from Africa – the rest were based in Britain. Robert Adams came to England to study law and moved into acting.

Shooting
Filming began in 1943, with eight months shooting in Tanganyika. A U-boat sank cameras and stock on the way out. Cameras were impounded and shooting was held up with slow convoys, bad weather, a strike of lab men in Hollywood and difficulties involved in shooting in Technicolor.

Filming in Tanganyika cost an estimated £600,000. The film had to be re-done in England. The replica of the concert hall built at Denham Film Studios was one of the largest sets ever built in England.

Filming in England started in January 1945.

The movie was part of a series of movies which cost £3 million, aimed at beating Hollywood head on. The others were London Town (£700,000), Henry V (£450,000) and Caesar and Cleopatra (£1,300,000).

Music
Muir Mathieson, head of music at Denham, commissioned Arthur Bliss to compose the score. Bliss combined his own style with ethnically derived material - he used some authentic recordings of East African music to help with this. The African influence is also evident from the use of a male chorus in the score. The film opens with a performance of Kisenga's Piano Concerto - an example of what Steve Race named "Denham Concertos" - which was performed on the soundtrack by pianist Eileen Joyce. It was extracted as a concert piece, Baraza (1946), and recorded in the same year on a Decca 78, with Mathieson conducting Joyce and the National Symphony Orchestra. Bliss liked the music, and described director Thorold Dickinson as “one of the nicest people (I'd) ever come across to work with”.

Release
The film had its world premiere at Avalon Cinema in Dar es Salaam on 16 July 1946. It then had its London premiere in front of the King and Queen.

Box Office
According to trade papers, the film was a "notable box office attraction" at British cinemas.

According to one report, it was the 17th most popular film at the British box office in 1946 after The Wicked Lady, The Bells of St. Mary's, Piccadilly Incident, The Captive Heart, Road to Utopia, Caravan, Anchors Away, The Corn is Green, Gilda, The House on 92nd Street, The Overlanders, Appointment with Crime, The Bandit of Sherwood Forest, Kitty, Spellbound, and Scarlet Street.

According to Kinematograph Weekly the 'biggest winner' at the box office in 1946 Britain was The Wicked Lady, with "runners up" being The Bells of St Marys, Piccadilly Incident, The Road to Utopia, Tomorrow is Forever, Brief Encounter, Wonder Man, Anchors Away, Kitty, The Captive Heart, The Corn is Green, Spanish Main, Leave Her to Heaven, Gilda, Caravan, Mildred Pierce, Blue Dahlia, Years Between, O.S.S., Spellbound, Courage of Lassie, My Reputation, London Town, Caesar and Cleopatra, Meet the Navy, Men of Two Worlds, Theirs is the Glory, The Overlanders, and Bedelia.

However it is unlikely the film recouped its enormous cost.

US Release
The film had trouble being seen in the US due to censor concerns over its depiction of black people. It was not released in the US until 1952.

Reputation Today
BFI Screenonline later said the film was "a creditable effort to tell an African story from the point of view of an African. The story only makes sense if we identify with Kisenga's dilemmas. Only he can resolve a situation in which the African and the European world views are at loggerheads, and he is prepared to give up his life in the struggle. The film gives us unusually authentic-seeming pictures of village life and ritual, and invests the people with a certain dignity and sensibility, even if ultimately they prefer superstition and fear to science. The photography is slow-moving and beautifully composed; African faces appear on screen distinct with emotion and individuality."

Martin Scorsese, an admirer of Dickinson, later said "He didn't make many films, but each is a fascinating project. Even when the movie doesn't work, like Men of Two Worlds or The Prime Minister, you're struck by the choice of subject matter, by the vivacity of the film-making, the intelligence of the approach."
 
Dickinson and Carey travelled to India in January 1946 to research a film to be made there.

References

External links

Men of Two Worlds at BFI Screenonline
Men of Two Worlds at Colonial Film
Review of film at Variety
. Review of film  at New York Times

1946 films
1946 drama films
British drama films
Films directed by Thorold Dickinson
Films set in the British Empire
Films set in Tanganyika
Films set in London
1940s English-language films
1940s British films
Films about witch doctors